Ancorabolidae is a family of copepods belonging to the order Harpacticoida.

Genera

Genera:
 Algensiella Cottarelli & Baldari, 1987
 Ancorabolina George, 2006
 Ancorabolus Norman, 1903

References

Copepods